Mauro Menezes (born 27 July 1963) is a former professional tennis player from Brazil. 

Menezes enjoyed most of his tennis success while playing doubles. During his career, he won one doubles title. He achieved a career-high doubles ranking of World No. 62 in 1989.

Career finals

Doubles (1 title, 4 runner-ups)

References

External links
 
 

Brazilian male tennis players
Tennis players from São Paulo
1963 births
Living people